Vladimir Jokanović (born 4 October 1961) is a Serbian professional basketball coach and former player who is the head coach for AS Basket Belgrade of the 4th-tier Second Regional League of Serbia.

Playing career 
During his playing days as a guard, Jokanović played for domestic clubs KK Put, OKK Beograd, Borovica, Beobanka, Beovuk, Wiener Broker Niš, and Beopetrol. Most of his playing career he spent with OKK Beograd. Over 220 season games in ten seasons, he scored 1.840 points. Jokanović retired as a player with Beopetrol in 1998.

Coaching career 
After retirement in 1998, Jokanović returned to OKK Beograd as a coach of their youth system. In 1999, he became the head coach of the senior team. Two years later, he was hired as the head coach of Kotež. Thereafter, he coached Prokupac and the Romanian club Dinamo București.

In 2009, Jokanović was hired as the head coach of AS Basket Belgrade.

References

External links 
 Vladimir Jokanovic at eurobasket.com

1961 births
Living people
Guards (basketball)
KK Beopetrol/Atlas Beograd players
KK Beovuk 72 players
KK Borovica players
KK Crvena zvezda youth players
OKK Beograd players
KK AS Basket coaches
OKK Beograd coaches
Serbian men's basketball coaches
Serbian men's basketball players
Serbian expatriate basketball people in Romania
Sportspeople from Zrenjanin
Yugoslav men's basketball players